Ingrid Guardiola Sánchez is a Spanish director, producer and cultural essayist, and the director of the Bòlit Cultural Center in Girona since 2021.

She has a Doctor of Humanities from Pompeu Fabra University. She has been a lecturer at the University of Girona, and is an essayist, audiovisual producer and cultural researcher. Her work explores the socio-cultural relationships established between culture, technology and society, and addresses issues such as inequality and gender.

In the field of cultural management and production she has made contents and coordinated projects for the CCCB (2002–2020), MINIPUT Quality Television Festival (2002–2018), the Mercat Audiovisual de Catalunya-MAC (2005–2006) and Primavera Sound (PrimaveraPro on Screen, year one, 2016).

She has been a member of the executive committee of the Council of Culture of Barcelona City Council (2016–2021) and of the board of Hangar (since 2020), and currently also collaborates with MINIPUT, the Cinema Truffaut and the Teatre Lliure. She has co-curated or participated in the exhibitions Radiomensió (El Prat de Llobregat, 2009), La dimensió poc coneguda: Pioneres del cinema (Museu del Cine, 2014), Terralab (2016–2018, MUME, Museu de l'Empordà). In 2017 she released her first documentary feature, Casa de ningú (Boogaloo Films, Open Society Foundations, CCCB). In 2018 she published her first essay, "L'ull i la navalla: un assaig sobre el món com a interfície" (Serra d'Or Critic's Prize for Essay), and has just published her second essay written with Marta Segarra: "Fils, un assaig sobre el confinament, la vigilància i l'anormalitat" (Arcàdia, 2020).

References 

Film directors from Catalonia
21st-century essayists
1980 births
Living people